Cospatrick was a wooden three-masted full-rigged sailing ship that caught fire south of the Cape of Good Hope early on 18 November 1874, while on a voyage from Gravesend, England, to Auckland, New Zealand. Only three of the 472 persons on board survived the disaster, which is often considered the worst in New Zealand's history.

History
Cospatrick was a Blackwall Frigate built at Moulmein (now Mawlamyaing) in Burma in 1856 for prominent London shipowner Duncan Dunbar. Following Dunbar's death in 1862, the ship was sold to Smith, Fleming & Co. of London. Cospatrick spent most of her career trading between England and India carrying passengers, troops, and cargo. In 1863, Cospatrick was engaged with other ships to lay a telegraphic cable in the Persian Gulf. She had also made two voyages to Australia before being sold to Shaw, Savill & Co. of London in 1873. Cospatrick then became one of many ships owned by this company that carried cargo and emigrants from England to New Zealand.

Destruction
Cospatrick sailed from Gravesend for Auckland on 11 September 1874 with 433 passengers and 44 crew under Captain Alexander Elmslie. The passengers included 429 assisted emigrants, of which 125 were women and 126 were children. During the course of the voyage, eight infants died and one was born (plus another still-birth).

The ship's second mate, Henry Macdonald, later recounted that he had retired at midnight, and was awoken half an hour later by a cry of "Fire!". He hurried onto the deck, and found that a fire had broken out in the boatswain's store, where oakum, tar, paint and ropes were stored. The crew was summoned to man the fire hoses, while the Captain and crew tried, but failed, to turn the ship before the wind, to take the smoke and flames forward and to contain the fire.

The fire rapidly grew out of control and panic ensued. Although there were five lifeboats on board capable of carrying 187 people, only two were successfully launched. These two boats stayed together until the night of 21 November, when one of the boats went missing during a storm. British Sceptre picked up the surviving boat on 27 November, by which time there were only five men left alive; they had been reduced to drinking the blood and eating the livers of their dead companions. Two of the survivors died shortly after being rescued.

Aftermath 

An inquiry found it most likely that the fire had been caused by members of the crew or passengers broaching cargo in the hold using a naked light, thus igniting the large quantity of flammable cargo including tar, oil, varnish and pitch. Another idea was spontaneous combustion. The lack of lifeboats and inability to launch them successfully at sea also caused public outrage, but little was done until after the loss of the Titanic in 1912.

See also
List of disasters in New Zealand by death toll
HMS Orpheus (1860)
R v Dudley and Stephens

Notes

References

External links
 

1856 ships
British ships built in Burma
Victorian-era merchant ships of the United Kingdom
Shipwrecks in the Atlantic Ocean
Maritime incidents in November 1874
Maritime history of New Zealand
Incidents of cannibalism
Three-masted ships
Ship fires
1874 in the Cape Colony
1874 in New Zealand
1874 fires